Raymond Jones is a television composer who is best known for his work on Doctor Who.

Jones's work on Doctor Who was during William Hartnell's era as the First Doctor in The Romans (1965) and The Savages (1966), but he also composed for three episodes of BBC television's Wodehouse Playhouse in 1975.

External links

British television composers
Possibly living people
Year of birth missing
Place of birth missing